Invasion: How America Still Welcomes Terrorists, Criminals, and Other Foreign Menaces to Our Shores is a 2002 book written by conservative political commentator and author Michelle Malkin. In it, she states that the U.S. immigration system is plagued by bureaucratic inertia, political correctness, corruption and pressure from corporate special interests, that weaknesses in the US immigration system played a role in the September 11, 2001 attacks, and that criminals and terrorists are able to exploit loopholes to get into the United States.

Reviews
The book was reviewed in National Review, Reason Magazine, International Migration Review, and Human Events, and reached #14 on the New York Times best-seller list.

References

External links
Full text available at Internet Archive
Chapter 1: What Would Mohammed Do
Interview with Malkin on Invasion. C-SPAN Booknotes, December 8, 2002.

2002 non-fiction books
Non-fiction books about immigration to the United States
Regnery Publishing books
Books by Michelle Malkin